Espoir BBC is a Rwandan professional basketball club based in Kigali. The club competes in Rwanda's National Basketball League.

Traditionally, the club has provided several of Africa's national teams with key players.

Honours
National Basketball League: 4
2011–12, 2012–13, 2013–14, 2014–15

Current roster

Notable players

 Lionel Hakizimana
 Kami Kabangu
 Aristide Mugabe
 Presta Nzuzi Malemba
 Dean Bezazouma

References

External links
Presentation at africabasket.com
Presentation on Facebook

Basketball teams in Rwanda
Sport in Kigali
Basketball teams established in 2003